The tram system in Ljubljana, the capital of Slovenia, was originally built in 1901 and was operated until 1958. Slovenia was then part of Austria-Hungary and Yugoslavia, respectively. Work started in 1900 and the tram was put in use after postponements and without a special ceremony on 6 September 1901. The tram system's end came on 20 December 1958, when it was replaced in a ceremony by 12 buses.

Overview
In the post-World War II era, many Yugoslav towns and cities with tram systems took out their systems, as they took up a lot of space in an era when it was needed for an increasing number of automobiles. Soon after the last day of operation the tracks were dismantled and the cars were transferred to Osijek and Subotica. Reintroduction of an actual tram system to Ljubljana has been proposed repeatedly in the 2000s.

See also 
 List of rubber-tyred tram systems

References

External links

Map of Ljubljana tram system at Geopedia.si.

Tram system
Tram transport in Slovenia
1901 establishments in Austria-Hungary
Tram system
Articles containing video clips
Ljubljana